This is a list of members of the 11th Lok Sabha arranged by state or territory represented. These members of the lower house of the Indian Parliament were elected to the 11th Lok Sabha (1996 to 1998) at the 1996 Indian general election.

Andaman and Nicobar Islands

Andhra Pradesh

Arunachal Pradesh

Assam

Bihar

Chandigarh

Chhattisgarh

Dadra and Nagar Haveli

Daman and Diu

Delhi

Goa

Gujarat

Haryana

Himachal Pradesh

Jammu and Kashmir

Jharkhand

Karnataka

Kerala

Lakshadweep

Madhya Pradesh

Maharashtra

Manipur

Meghalaya

Mizoram

Nagaland

Odisha

Puducherry

Punjab

Rajasthan

Sikkim

Tamil Nadu

Telangana

Tripura

Uttar Pradesh

Uttarakhand

West Bengal

References

List
11